Orlando is a town in Logan and Payne counties in the U.S. state of Oklahoma. The population was 148 at the 2010 census, compared to the figure of 201 in 2000. It is part of the Oklahoma City Metropolitan Statistical Area.

History
Before the opening of the Cherokee Outlet for settlement, this community was called Cherokee, but the name was changed to Orlando, when a post office was opened on July 18, 1889.

Early Orlando had a colorful history. In 1892, Oliver Yantis, a member of the Doolin Gang, was wounded and captured outside of the town. He was brought into Orlando, where he died. In 1896, a group of con artists bought some homesteads near the town, salted them with gold nuggets and started a gold rush. Several townspeople lost a great deal of money before the plot was exposed. In 1902, a woman who had bought adulterated kerosene for the lamps in her house. The impure material exploded when she lit the lamps, starting a fire that killed her, two children and spread to several nearby houses.

A 1927 tornado killed two people and destroyed several houses. Construction of Lake Carl Blackwell in the 1930s forced about 100 families that had regularly traded in Orlando to move away.

Passenger train service through Orlando ceased after World War II ended, and construction of I-35 caused the town to lose most of its commercial highway traffic after 1964.

Geography
Orlando is located at  (36.148267, -97.377512).

Demographics

At the 2000 census there were 201 people, 74 households, and 52 families in the town. The racial makeup of the town was 86.07% White, 9.95% Native American, 1.00% Asian, and 2.99% from two or more races.
Of the 74 households 33.8% had children under the age of 18 living with them, 51.4% were married couples living together, 10.8% had a female householder with no husband present, and 29.7% were non-families. 25.7% of households were one person and 12.2% were one person aged 65 or older. The average household size was 2.72 and the average family size was 3.29.

The age distribution was 29.9% under the age of 18, 11.9% from 18 to 24, 24.4% from 25 to 44, 22.4% from 45 to 64, and 11.4% 65 or older. The median age was 32 years. For every 100 females, there were 105.1 males. For every 100 females age 18 and over, there were 98.6 males.

The median household income was $28,929 and the median family income  was $35,625. Males had a median income of $30,000 versus $27,500 for females. The per capita income for the town was $12,826. About 18.0% of families and 17.8% of the population were below the poverty line, including 15.4% of those under the age of eighteen and 14.3% of those sixty five or over.

References

Towns in Logan County, Oklahoma
Towns in Payne County, Oklahoma
Towns in Oklahoma
Oklahoma City metropolitan area